Kalinichi is a rural locality (a village) in Vereshchaginsky District, Perm Krai, Russia. The population was 33 as of 2010.

Geography 
Kalinichi is located 33 km west of Vereshchagino (the district's administrative centre) by road. Katayevo is the nearest rural locality.

References 

Rural localities in Vereshchaginsky District